James C. Coyne (born 22 October 1947)  is an American psychologist.

Education and career
Born in Chelsea, Massachusetts, Coyne attended New London High School in New London, Connecticut. He received his B.A. (1968) from Carnegie-Mellon University and his Ph.D. in psychology (1975) from Indiana University Bloomington (dissertation title Depression and the Response of Others). After being a Clinical Psychology Intern at the University of Florida in 1972–3, he was an instructor at Miami University from 1973 to 1975, where he became an assistant professor in 1975. He became professor at the Perelman School of Medicine at the University of Pennsylvania in 1999, and became an emeritus professor there upon his retirement in 2013.

Coyne was named an ISI Highly Cited Researcher by Clarivate Analytics in 2001, and was ranked #200 in a 2014 list of the most eminent psychologists of the post-World War II era.

Research
Coyne's research from the 1980s suggested that negative responses by others to depressive behavior can increase the social isolation of depressed individuals, potentially leading to a "depressive spiral".

A 2007 study led by Coyne found that positive emotional well-being was not associated with increased life expectancy among head and neck cancer patients.

Views
Coyne has criticized the field of positive psychology and the research claiming that a positive attitude can impact one's health. He has also criticized studies which have concluded that personality traits are linked to an increased risk of cancer death.

Coyne has stated that a 1970s study by Ellen Langer, which found that elderly people given plants to take care of lived longer than those who were not, would not have "much credibility today, nor would it meet the tightened standards of rigor."

Coyne has also criticized studies that claimed to have shown that acceptance and commitment therapy was effective in reducing rehospitalization in cases of psychosis. In his article "Troubles in the Branding of Psychotherapies as "Evidence Supported'", Coyne stated:

In 2015, Coyne attacked Gabriele Oettingen's book Rethinking Positive Thinking and accused Oettingen of aggressively promoting pseudoscience while ignoring other research in clinical psychology. Coyne pointed out that as part of Oettingen's aggressive promotional campaign for her book, her own son created Wikipedia articles about her work.

In 2017, Coyne attacked his co-editors at the Journal of Health Psychology, calling one a "disgusting old fart neoliberal hypocrite" and telling another to "f*** off. Let's get all this backchannel bullshit into the open, you ol' sleazebag". The disagreements were over the special issue on the PACE trial for chronic fatigue syndrome, which three of his co-editors considered to be too one-sided.

References

External links
Profile at Google Scholar

1947 births
Living people
Carnegie Mellon University alumni
Indiana University Bloomington alumni
21st-century American psychologists
Cancer researchers
University of Pennsylvania faculty
People from Chelsea, Massachusetts
Perelman School of Medicine at the University of Pennsylvania faculty
20th-century American psychologists